Darryl Anthony Tapp (born September 13, 1984) is a former American football defensive end and outside linebacker who played twelve seasons in the National Football League (NFL). He is currently an assistant defensive line coach for the San Francisco 49ers. He played college football at Virginia Tech and was drafted by the Seattle Seahawks in the second round of the 2006 NFL Draft.

Tapp has played for the Philadelphia Eagles, Washington Redskins, Detroit Lions, New Orleans Saints, and Tampa Bay Buccaneers.

Early years
Tapp attended Deep Creek High School in Chesapeake, Virginia where he lettered in football, basketball, and track and field. His senior year, Tapp set a school record with 15 sacks and made 89 tackles and was named Second-team All-State. In all, he recorded 22 career sacks while helping Deep Creek to a 34–4 record during his three varsity seasons. He was one of just three juniors to start on offense and defense for Deep Creek in 2000 when he played in all 14 games and posted eight quarterback sacks and earned First-team All-District.

College career
Tapp played as a true freshman in 2002 at Virginia Tech, mostly on special teams.  Against Virginia, he returned a punt blocked by Justin Hamilton for a touchdown and for Tapp's first collegiate score. On the season, he recorded nine solo tackles and 12 assists, three quarterback hurries and a pass broken up. Tapp set a position record for defensive ends with a 660-pound back squat during the spring. He also had a 415-pound bench press and a 340-pound push jerk, a 530-pound back squat, a 32-inch vertical jump and a 4.71 time in the forty yard dash. In 2003, he compiled 58 total tackles—nine tackles for loss, including three sacks and 17 quarterback hurries and a forced fumble. In 2004, Tapp won the starting job, taking over for Nathaniel Adibi as the boundary defensive end and started all 13 games, registered 60 tackles were 16.5 tackles for loss and 8.5 sacks and had 23 quarterback hurries, two fumble recoveries, a forced fumble, a pass break up, an interception and a blocked kick as was named First-team All-Atlantic Coast Conference. During his senior year in 2005, he started all thirteen games make 48 tackles (14.5 for losses) and 10 sacks and as First-team All-ACC again. His accomplishments for the Hokies led to his induction into the Virginia Tech Sports Hall of Fame in 2018.

Professional career

Seattle Seahawks
Tapp was drafted by the Seattle Seahawks in the second round (63rd overall) of the 2006 NFL Draft. As a rookie, Tapp was a special teamer and part of the Seahawks' defensive end rotation. He recorded 33 tackles, three sacks, one forced fumble, one interception, and one defensive touchdown. In 2007, he saw a lot more playing time, as the Seahawks' former starting left end Grant Wistrom was cut from the team, and the right end Bryce Fisher was traded to the Titans. As a result, he started all 16 games for the Seahawks with new arrival Patrick Kerney as the other defensive end. In 2007, Tapp made 49 tackles, seven sacks, and one interception.

On October 21, 2007, Tapp had four sacks and forced a fumble against the St. Louis Rams, a personal best. Two weeks after, Tapp had an interception against Cleveland Browns' quarterback Derek Anderson.

On December 25, 2009, Green Bay Packers' quarterback Aaron Rodgers accused Tapp of biting him on his left arm in their matchup in the 2008 season.

Philadelphia Eagles
On March 16, 2010, the Seahawks traded Tapp to the Philadelphia Eagles in exchange for Chris Clemons and a fourth-round draft pick in 2010. Tapp was signed by the Eagles to a three-year contract after passing his physical on March 18. On September 26, 2010, Tapp recorded his first sack as an Eagle, bringing down Jacksonville Jaguars' quarterback David Garrard. On January 9, 2011, Tapp recorded his first-career postseason sack, bringing down Green Bay Packers' quarterback Aaron Rodgers.

Washington Redskins
On March 28, 2013, Tapp signed a one-year deal with the Washington Redskins. On September 29, 2013, Tapp recorded his first sack as a member of the Redskins, tackling Oakland Raiders' quarterback Matt Flynn.

Detroit Lions
On March 13, 2014, Tapp signed a one-year contract with the Detroit Lions. Tapp was released on August 30, 2014, from the Lions. On March 2, 2015, the Lions re-signed Tapp to a one-year contract. In 2015, Tapp earned the Detroit Lions-Detroit Sports Broadcasters Association-Pro Football Writers Association (Detroit Chapter) Media-Friendly Good Guy Award.

New Orleans Saints
On July 6, 2016, Tapp was signed to the New Orleans Saints. On September 3, 2016, he was released by the Saints but re-signed on September 5, 2016.

On March 23, 2017, Tapp re-signed with the Saints. He was released on September 5, 2017, re-signed later that month, but was released again.

Tampa Bay Buccaneers
On October 25, 2017, Tapp signed with the Tampa Bay Buccaneers. He was released by the Buccaneers on November 28, 2017.

Coaching career
On December 13, 2019, Tapp returned to Virginia Tech to become the Co-Defensive Line Coach.

San Francisco 49ers
On February 11, 2021, Tapp joined San Francisco 49ers Head Coach Kyle Shanahan's staff as an assistant defensive line coach.

Personal life
Tapp has been long-time friends with retired cornerback DeAngelo Hall since childhood, the two having gone to the same school from elementary school throughout college and being teammates. They would become teammates again in their professional career when they both played for the Washington Redskins in 2013.

References

External links
San Francisco 49ers bio
Virginia Tech Hokies bio 

1984 births
Living people
Sportspeople from Portsmouth, Virginia
Sportspeople from Chesapeake, Virginia
Players of American football from Virginia
African-American Christians
African-American players of American football
American football defensive ends
Virginia Tech Hokies football players
Seattle Seahawks players
Philadelphia Eagles players
Washington Redskins players
Detroit Lions players
New Orleans Saints players
Tampa Bay Buccaneers players
San Francisco 49ers coaches
21st-century African-American sportspeople
20th-century African-American people